Agaete is a municipality of Las Palmas province, on the Canary Islands, Spain.

Geography 
It is in the north-west of Gran Canaria island, and is enclosed by the Atlantic Ocean to the west, Gáldar to the north-east, and Artenara to the south.

Tourism 
The port of Agaete, Puerto de las Nieves, used to be the preferred place to get a view of El Dedo de Dios, a natural monument on the coastline, before the latter was destroyed during tropical storm Delta in November 2005. The port is a common end point for day tours from more touristic areas of the island.

Archaeology 
El Maipes necropolis is on the outskirts of the town, in the south-east near the football ground.

Gallery

See also
List of municipalities in Las Palmas

References

External links

Ayuntamiento de Agaete
Photos of Agaete, including Puerto de Las Nieves and the valley, "El Valle"

Municipalities in Gran Canaria